Katerina Maleeva was the defending champion but did not compete that year.

Patty Fendick won in the final 6–3, 7–5 against Stephanie Rehe.

Seeds
A champion seed is indicated in bold text while text in italics indicates the round in which that seed was eliminated.

  Natasha Zvereva (second round)
  Larisa Savchenko (quarterfinals)
  Catarina Lindqvist (first round)
  Patty Fendick (champion)
  Anne Minter (quarterfinals)
  Stephanie Rehe (final)
  Etsuko Inoue (first round)
  Gigi Fernández (second round)

Draw

External links
 1988 Suntory Japan Open Tennis Championships draw

Singles